Yunus Şencay (born 4 February 1997) is a Turkish footballer who plays as midfielder for 1074 Çankırıspor.

Professional career
A youth product of Gaziantepspor, Şencay made his professional debut for the club a 4–1 loss to Antalyaspor on 2 June 2017. He stayed with the club until 2018, where he and several other players were indefinitely excluded from the squad. He followed that up with stints with Karaköprü Belediyespor, Yozgatspor, before moving to 1074 Çankırıspor in 2021.

References

External links
 
 
 Kicker Profile

1997 births
Living people
People from Şehitkamil
Turkish footballers
Gaziantepspor footballers
Süper Lig players
TFF First League players
TFF Third League players
Association football midfielders